Balninkai is a town in Utena County, Lithuania. According to the 2011 census, the town has a population of 319 people.

References

Towns in Lithuania
Towns in Utena County
Vilkomirsky Uyezd
Molėtai District Municipality